Senator Fuller may refer to:

Allen C. Fuller (1822–1901), Illinois State Senate
Benoni S. Fuller (1825–1903), Indiana State Senate
Charles Eugene Fuller (1849–1926), Illinois State Senate
Charles H. Fuller (1859–1938), New York State Senate
DuFay A. Fuller (1852–1924), Illinois State Senate
Jean Fuller (born 1950), California State Senate
Jerome Fuller (1808–1880), New York State Senate
Levi K. Fuller (1841–1896), Vermont State Senate
Philo C. Fuller (1787–1855), New York State Senate
Timothy Fuller (1778–1835), Massachusetts State Senate